Abdulrahman Akkad (Arabic: عبدالرحمن عقاد; born in Aleppo on May 17, 1998) is a Syrian political blogger public speaker and human rights Activist He currently resides in Berlin.

Early life and education 

Akkad was born in 1998 in the city of Aleppo in northern Syria to Syrian Muslim parents of Jewish origin, his mother's name is "Manal Akkad" his family is descended from Sephardi Jews who later converted to Islam. Akkad has three brothers and a sister, Akkad has only finished his intermediate education. In 2010, Akkad graduated from Dhat Al-Sawari Primary with a primary degree, and after three years in 2013, just before leaving Syria, Akkad graduated from Abdulwahab Al-Shawaf Junior High with a middle school diploma. However, Akkad was unable to further continue his education after leaving Syria in 2013.

With the escalation of events and the Syrian civil war, Akkad and his family were forced to leave Syria in July 2013.

Turkey 
Akkad entered Turkey with his Family in July 2013 and lived in Istanbul, he worked as a translator in call center companies in the city, and he speaks Turkish fluently. his father traveled to Germany illegally in the summer of 2015 and Akkad and his family were waiting his father to apply for family reunion for them later, Akkad discovered his sexual orientation. He later hated himself and tried to commit suicide several times. He went to a psychological counselor who provided him with support and helped him accept himself. He tried to obtain a humanitarian visa from the Swiss Consulate in Istanbul but was refused. Akkad decided to stay in Turkey and told his family about his sexual orientation and thought that they would accept and love him as he is. His family accused him of being sick and in need of treatment. He was taken to a doctor in Turkey who conducted an anal examination, sexually harassed him, and wrote him testosterone. He took several doses of the hormone and later refused to take more because it caused him depression and tension. His older brother beat and locked him up in a room for two months where he did not see sunlight. He was abused and threatened with death by his brother, sister's husband and cousins. He later managed to convince them that he was no longer gay and took his passport and $200 and ran away from the house to a friend's house.

Asylum 
His friend suggested that he should travel to Europe because the situation in Turkey is dangerous for him, especially that Akkad's family has influence in Turkey and because the Turkish authorities will not protect him from the oppression of this family, and indeed Akkad traveled illegally to Greece at the end of November 2015 and his friend covered his travel costs.

Akkad traveled illegally to Greece by sea, and then traveled to Macedonia, Serbia, Croatia, Slovenia, and Austria until he arrived in Germany on December 5, 2015, where he applied for asylum based on his sexual orientation.

Akkad was granted asylum in 2016 and his asylum procedure was delayed because he was a minor at the time

Coming out 
In 2017, before Akkad came out he agreed to be engaged to a girl from the family because of the pressure his family had put on him, His mother told him that his sexual orientation would change after he married. Within a few months the matter became serious and the wedding was to be held in Istanbul. In the end, he decided to post a live Video on Facebook, in which he announced his sexual orientation. The video was directed to his family only, but the video was withdrawn and published on many Arab pages and groups, The video garnered hundreds of thousands of views within a week.

Akkad was bullied, insulted and threatened with death by Arabs and Muslims in Germany.

On July 24, 2017, Akkad streamed a live video on Facebook, coming out as gay after fearing that his family would have had forced him to marry a woman against his will. The video was shared on various Arab social channels, as it was the first ever occurrence of a gay Syrian man publicly expressing his sexual orientation in a video with his real name and face.

On July 24, 2020, Akkad shared a picture of him with his family, officially announcing their acceptance of his sexual orientation and that they love him unconditionally, also declaring victory over customs, traditions and society This photo is also considered to be the first of its kind with an Arab family publicly accepting their gay son's sexual orientation.

Activism in Germany 
In subsequent years, Akkad has given many interviews to several media, primarily German and Arabic ones, about his experiences and his political opinions Especially on the situation of homosexuality and LGBT rights in the Middle East, Akkad gave his first interview to the famous German Newspaper (Bild) in Germany and said that he doesn't want to stay in Germany because of the threats he received.

Akkad participated in the Me Too movement and admitted that he was sexually harassed and encouraged people to participate in the campaign and speak out.

Akkad worked with Atheist Refugee Relief Organization in Germany and helped many refugees and appeared with them at the Cologne Pride in 2019 wearing the Niqab to support women who are forced to wear it in Saudi Arabia and in the Middle East.

Akkad posted a video wearing the Rainbow flag in front of a mosque in Germany in the Gay pride in 2020 and he Solidarity with Homosexuals in the Middle East and Islamic countries, where homosexuality is illegal and punishable by death.

Career 
Akkad is an openly gay activist in the MENA region specially in Syria and the German media described him as a "hated figure" in the Arab world.

Political views 
Akkad identifies as secular, supporting the principle of separation of the state from religious institutions. And as a former member of the Atheist Refugee Relief organization, Akkad aided many Atheist & LGBT+ Middle Eastern refugees in Germany.

Akkad's story was mentioned during the federal government session of the Federal parliament of Germany for Human Rights in 2020 by German philosopher David Berger after Instagram banned his account because he was gay and the threats he was exposed to.

Abdulrahman and his family have also been strong opponents of the Syrian regime, especially after Akkad's sister-in-law was shot and killed by a regime sniper in 2012, leading his brother to dissent from the army, and forcing his entire family to flee the country after severe pressure imposed by al-Assad's authorities.

He encouraged the deportation of refugees who did not integrate into German society and did not respect the law and the constitution. He supported the German government's decision to deport Syrian refugees who committed crimes to Syria and encouraged the deportation of supporters of the Syrian regime.

Akkad criticized the German government's policy in dealing with refugee and integration laws, and said that he was tired of neglecting the German police for not knowing how to deal with the threats he received from Arabs in Germany and Europe.

Reactions 
There has been a long history of oppression and discrimination against the LGBT community in the Arab world through censorship, hate speech, and government-coordinated persecution. Akkad's story has been met with some supportive, but mostly homophobic responses through media coverage and public discourse. Akkad even started receiving death threats after coming out.

See also 
LGBT rights in Syria
LGBT rights in the Middle East
LGBT in Islam

References

Further reading
Akkad, Abdulrahman (May 5, 2021). Bundestag of David Berger 14th report of the German Federal Government on its human rights policy (reporting period October 1, 2018 to September 30, 2020)

External links 

Official Website Archived September 5, 2021 on Wayback Machine

 
 
 

Arab activists
1998 births
Living people
Syrian LGBT rights activists
Syrian LGBT people
People from Aleppo
Syrian exiles
Syrian emigrants to Germany
Gay men
Syrian bloggers
Syrian human rights activists
Syrian humanitarians
Syrian democracy activists
People of the Syrian civil war
Syrian dissidents
Syrian refugees
Syrian feminists
Gay politicians